The Tomb of the Gwanggaeto (Traditional Chinese: 廣開土(王)陵  or 好太(王)陵, Korean: Gwanggaeto-(Wang)neung, Hangul: 광개토(왕)릉 또는 호태(왕) 릉), also known as the Pyramid of the Hotae, is thought to be the burial tomb of King Jangsu or his Father King Gwanggaeto, both kings of a kingdom of Goguryeo.

See also
Three Kingdoms of Korea
Goguryeo
History of Korea
Korean architecture

References

Archaeological sites in China
Goguryeo
History of Korea
Buildings and structures in Jilin